Aelianus or Aelian was together with Amandus the leader of an insurrection of Gallic peasants, called Bagaudae, in the reign of Diocletian.  It was put down by the Caesar Maximianus Herculius in 285. The rebellion he led with Amandus in 285 was attributed by some to Christianity, but Edward Gibbon doubts this in The Decline and Fall of the Roman Empire.

References

 

3rd-century Gallo-Roman people
3rd-century Roman usurpers
280s deaths
Year of birth unknown
Tetrarchy